Pontes (Latin for "bridges") may refer to:

 Pontes, the Roman fort beside Trajan's Bridge over the Danube
 Pontes, the Roman name for Staines in Britain, where major bridges crossed the Thames as part of the Devil's Highway